Alliance for Creativity and Entertainment (ACE) is a coalition of over 30 major global entertainment companies and film studios aimed at protecting profits from copyrighted material.  It was launched on June 13, 2017.

The stated mission of ACE is to protect profits, drawing on the anti-piracy resources of the Motion Picture Association of America (MPAA). The organisation plans to conduct research into online pirating, lobby law enforcement to stop and sue pirate enterprises, file sweeping civil litigations, and to "pursue voluntary agreements with responsible parties across the internet ecosystem" — such as search engines and broadband providers.

On October 31st 2019, they shut down the streaming providers Openload and Streamango.

The organisation promotes itself as marking a new level of coordination among multiple stakeholders.

Background
According to anti-piracy watchdogs, internet users worldwide saved $107.9 billion by streaming from free content distributors in 2016. The efforts of the industry have proven ineffective at preventing online piracy. According to ACE, there are now as few as 480 online services complying with copyright law in an attempt to stem global demand for copyrighted content.

Members
As of March 2023, the members of the Alliance for Creativity and Entertainment are:

  Amazon
  Apple TV+
  AMC Networks
  Aniplex (Sony)
  BBC Studios
  Bell Media
  Canal+ Group
  Channel 5
  Crunchyroll (Sony)
  Constantin Film
  Foxtel
  France Télévisions
  Grupo Globo
  Hulu
  Lionsgate
  Metro-Goldwyn-Mayer
  Millennium Media
  NBCUniversal
  Netflix
  OSN
  Paramount Global
  RTL Deutschland
  Sentai Filmworks (AMC Networks)
  SF Studios
  Sky
  Sony Pictures
  Disney Star
  Studio Babelsberg
  STX Entertainment
  Telefe
  Telemundo
  TelevisaUnivision
  TrueVisions
  United Group
  Village Roadshow
  ViuTV
  The Walt Disney Company
  Warner Bros. Discovery

See also
Content Overseas Distribution Association, a similar Japanese anti-piracy group for anime and manga series

References

Arts and media trade groups
Copyright law
Organizations established in 2017
Computer law
Copyright infringement